is a railway station on the Iida Line in the village of Minamiminowa, Kamiina District, Nagano Prefecture, Japan, operated by Central Japan Railway Company (JR Central).

Lines
Kitatono Station is an unattended station served by the Iida Line and is 183.2 kilometers from the starting point of the line at Toyohashi Station.

Station layout
The station consists of two ground-level opposed side platforms connected by a level crossing.

Platforms

Adjacent stations

History
Kitatono Station opened on 3 November 1911. From 1943 to 1956, the name of the station was officially pronounced "Kitadono Station". With the privatization of Japanese National Railways (JNR) on 1 April 1987, the station came under the control of JR Central. The current station building was completed in 1991.

Passenger statistics
In fiscal 2016, the station was used by an average of 287 passengers daily (boarding passengers only).

Surrounding area
The station is located in central Minamiminowa.

See also
 List of railway stations in Japan

References

External links

 Kitatono Station information 

Railway stations in Nagano Prefecture
Railway stations in Japan opened in 1911
Stations of Central Japan Railway Company
Iida Line
Minamiminowa, Nagano